Santosh Chauhan Sarwan is a member of the Haryana Legislative Assembly from the BJP representing the Mullana Vidhan sabha Constituency in Haryana.

References 

People from Rewari district
Bharatiya Janata Party politicians from Haryana
Living people
Haryana MLAs 2014–2019
Year of birth missing (living people)